Naimabad (also Romanized as Na‘īmābād; also known as Ma‘nābād) is a village in Eshqabad Rural District, Miyan Jolgeh District, Nishapur County, Razavi Khorasan Province, Iran. At the 2006 census, its population was 141, in 37 families.

References 

Populated places in Nishapur County